Federal Highway 97 (Carretera Federal 97) is a Federal Highway of Mexico. The highway travels from Reynosa, Tamaulipas in the north to Ampliación la Loma, Tamaulipas to the south. The southern terminus of the highway is just north of General Francisco Villa, Tamaulipas.

References

097